Shinto is the native religion of Japan and was once its state religion.

Shinto or Shintō may also refer to:
Shintō, Gunma, a village in Gunma Prefecture, Japan
Shinto (character) or Tenshinhan, a character in Dragon Ball media
A Javanese spelling of the Hindu goddess Sita.

See also
Shinto gods or kami
Shinto in Taiwan
Shinto music..
Shintō Musō-ryū
Shintō Musō-ryū Jo Kata